The Valais Cup is an international football tournament that is part of the Valais Football Summer Cups. It is played at the Stade de Tourbillon in Sion, Switzerland.

The competition features football teams preparing their season in Valais and its surroundings.

Five European top-clubs participated in the first edition of the tournament 6, 9 and 13 July 2013: Porto, Marseille, VfL Wolfsburg, Saint-Étienne and Sion. Porto won the Valais Cup after its victory 3–0 against Marseille.

Participants
The tournament featured five European clubs:
 Porto
 Marseille
 VfL Wolfsburg
 Saint-Étienne
 Sion

Competition format
The tournament consisted of three matchdays for a total of four matches. Sion, Marseille and VfL Wolfsburg played two games, while Saint-Étienne and Porto played only one match.

Results

Matchday 1

Matchday 2

Matchday 3

Ranking
During the Valais Cup, points were distributed as follows:
Victory after 90 minutes : 3 pts
Draw after 90 minutes + victory after penalty shootout : 2 pts
Draw after 90 minutes + defeat after penalty shootout : 1 pt
Defeat after 90 minutes : 0 pt

The ranking of each team will be determined as follows:

a)	greatest average number of points obtained per match (for teams that play two matches, the total number of points will be divided by two in order to obtain an average);
b)	direct confrontation (if applicable);
c)	average goal difference per match (for teams that play two matches, the total goal difference will be divided by two in order to obtain an average);
d)	average number of goals scored per match (for teams that play two matches, the total number of goals scored will be divided by two in order to obtain an average);
e)	by drawing lots in case it is not possible to decide between two teams on the basis of the rules laid down under letters a, b, c and d above.

Source: Valais Cup official website
Pld = Number of match player; W = Win; DW = Draw + victory after penalty shootout; DL = Draw + defeat after penalty shootout; L = Lost; GA (average) = Goal average/Number of matches played; PTS = Points; PTS Average = PTS/M

Awards
Best player:  Fernando – Porto
Best goalkeeper:  Helton – Porto

References

External links
 Official website

2013
2013–14 in Swiss football